Cristian Trabalón Laso is a Grand Prix motorcycle racer from Spain.

Career statistics

By season

Races by year
(key)

References

External links
 Profile on motogp.com

1992 births
Living people
Spanish motorcycle racers
125cc World Championship riders